The Mechanicals is a graphic novel written in conjunction with the film Southland Tales. It is Part Three of the Southland Tales saga. It was written by Richard Kelly, who also directed the film, and illustrated by Brett Weldele. It was published by Graphitti Designs.

Southland Tales was initially planned to be a nine-part "interactive experience", with the first six parts published in six 100-page graphic novels that would be released in a six-month period leading up to the film's release in 2007. The feature film comprises the final three parts of the experience. A website was also developed to intertwine with the graphic novels and the film itself. The idea of six graphic novels was later narrowed down to three.

Plot 

July 2, 2008: Madeline Frost Santaros (Mandy Moore) (daughter of the current Senator) calls her father and tells him that Boxer Santaros has been missing for several days. She and Boxer were married for several years. If word got out of his disappearance, it would effectively ruin Senator Bobby Frost’s chances of being re-elected.

A person is at the area where the first ball is buried and where Boxer is expected to arrive with the first clue. The person’s mission is to kidnap Boxer and abandon him in the desert.

July 3, 2008: Back at the Treer Plaza, General Teena MacArthur was inspecting the body found in the burnt-up SUV, so she calls a long friend named Simon Theory (Kevin Smith) to help her.

Ronald Taverner, Zora Carmichaels, Dream and Dion are having breakfast at their restaurant. He wants them to bring himself and his brother to a hospital, believing that there is something wrong with both of them. The Neo-Marxists explain their plan to Ronald. They show him ‘The Power’ script. They are going to get him to go on a ride-along with Boxer for preparation and research for his character. Dion and Dream are going to stage a dispute that Ronald will have to go investigate and pretend to shoot them both dead...and all on Boxer’s video camera.

At Fortunio Balducci’s house, he is reading the script when Serpentine (a mistress of the Baron’s) calls him and tells him to facilitate a meeting between Ronald Taverner and Boxer and in return she will pay him for it.

At the Neo-Marxist HQ, Roland Taverner is tied up and injected with Fluid Karma. The unconscious Roland begins singing The Killers' song, "All These Things That I've Done". They inject him once more and he stops.

Ronald finds a letter belonging to his brother from someone called Pilot Abilene. He asks Zora what he was. She tells him that he was an actor in a comedy troupe and he met Zora, Dion and Dream where they became ‘The Lighthouse Gang’.

Pilot Abilene is a former soldier who is now a guard of the generator dubbed 'Utopia Three' at the Santa Monica Pier. He was an actor who started out in an action movie with Boxer Santaros. The film was very bad but he became well-known from it, but his career ended when he was drafted to Iraq. It was here where he met Roland and the two became best friends. They learn of an experiment called ‘Serpentine Dream Theory’ - all they know is if one signs up for it, one is used as a guinea pig, but soon after, you are sent home. They go one night to visit Simon Theory (who is in charge of the experiment). He says no at first, saying that it is not for volunteers, but changes his mind once they bribe him. The next morning they are taken to a nearby airbase and each given an injection of Fluid Karma.

The next day, the two are about to drop from a helicopter. Pilot is nervous about it so Roland gives him his iPod to listen to during the drop. The song is "All These Things That I Have Done". They drop successfully and they infiltrate a building where their telepathy kicks in; the drug is working on them. Roland is in a state of dementia, so he throws a grenade into a room, which explodes next to Pilot, sending shrapnel into the left side of his face. They never see each other after that day.

The Neo-Marxists are holding another meeting, this time a lottery for thumbs (certain people will be selected to have their thumb cut off to rig the election, they can re-use the same thumb as many times as possible, turning the election in their favour). Ronald, Zora, Dion and Dream are in attendance. The winner is Bing Zinneman who receives a check for $50,000 and then had his thumb cut off his hand. Afterward, Krysta Now and her friends and colleagues Sheena Gee, Shoshanna Cox and Deena Storm are in the middle of a conversation. Krysta tells her three colleagues that she booked a gig on the Mega-Zeppelin for the Baron on July 4.

While this is happening, Boxer is walking the beaches of Venice during the night. He takes out the Fluid Karma syringe and injects himself. Before he loses consciousness, he murmurs, "Three Days...Three Final Days."

After Krysta leaves the bar where she was talking with her friends, she is cornered by Fortunio. He tells her to tell him everything about ‘Serpentine Dream Theory’. She says that Serpentine is "The Great Mistress of the Great Wizard" who some call the Anti-Christ...

Revelation 22:5 - "And there shall be no night there; and they need no candle, neither light of the sun; for the Lord God giveth them light: and they shall reign for ever and ever."

External links
Publisher page

2007 comics debuts
2007 graphic novels
Comics based on films